Gopinath may refer to:

Given name
Gopinath Bordoloi (1890–1950), Indian politician from Assam
Gopinath Das, Indian politician from Assam
Gopinath Kallianpur (1925–2015), Indian-American mathematician
Gopinath Kartha (1927–1984), crystallographer
Gopinath Kaviraj (1887–1976), Sanskrit scholar and philosopher
Gopinath Mohanty (1914–1991), Odia author
Gopinath Munde (1949–2014), Indian politician from Maharashtra
Gopinath Muthukad (born 1964), magician
Gopinath Panigrahi (1924–2004), botanist
Gopinath Pillai (born 1937), Singaporean diplomat
Gopinath Saha (1906–1924), freedom fighter
T. A. Gopinatha Rao, Indian archaeologist and epigraphist

Others
Gopinath (god), an incarnation of Lord Krishna
Gopinath Mandir, a Hindu temple in Uttarakhand
Gopinath (film), a 1948 Bollywood film